The Henry A. Wallace Beltsville Agricultural Research Center (BARC), also known as the National Agricultural Research Center, is a unit of the United States Department of Agriculture's Agricultural Research Service. It is located in unincorporated Prince George's County, Maryland, with sections within the Beltsville census-designated place. The BARC is named for Henry A. Wallace, former United States vice president and secretary of agriculture. BARC houses the Abraham Lincoln Building of the National Agricultural Library.

Among its research programs are Air Quality; Animal Health; Crop Production; Crop Protection and Quarantine; Food Animal Production; Food Safety; Global Change; Human Nutrition; Integrated Farming Systems; Manure and Byproduct Utilization; Methyl Bromide Alternatives; Plant Biological and Molecular Processes; Plant Diseases; Plant Genetic Resources, Genomics, and Genetic Improvement; Quality and Utilization of Agricultural Products; Rangeland, Pasture, and Forages; Soil Resource Management; Veterinary, Medical, and Urban Entomology; and Water Quality and Management.

Each February, BARC hosts the Washington's Birthday Marathon, the eighth oldest marathon in the United States.

During the tornado outbreak of September 24, 2001, the BARC facilities sustained extensive damage as the result of an F3 tornado. 

The center is also referenced in local folklore as the creation place of Goatman (urban legend), claiming that Goatman was once a scientist who worked at the center before an experiment on goats backfired and mutated the scientist into a half man, half goat creature who aggressively attacks cars in the vicinity of Beltsville.

See also
 Beltsville Small White

References

External links

 
 Agricultural Research Service Northeast Area
 
The Beltsville Small White: A Heritage Turkey (A digital exhibit containing information about the Small White and BARC)

United States Department of Agriculture facilities
Agricultural research institutes in the United States
Beltsville, Maryland
Buildings and structures in Prince George's County, Maryland
Government buildings in Maryland
Agriculture in Maryland
Superfund sites in Maryland
United States National Agricultural Library
Georgian Revival architecture in Maryland
Research institutes in Maryland